Marie-Louise is a 1944 Swiss German and French language film directed by Leopold Lindtberg and an uncredited Franz Schnyder. The film, distributed in the U.S. by Arthur Mayer and Joseph Burstyn, was the first foreign language film ever to win the Academy Award for Best Original Screenplay.

Cast 
 Josiane Hegg as Marie-Louise Fleury
 Heinrich Gretler as Direktor Rüegg / Director Rüegg
 Margrit Winter as Anna Rüegg
 Anne-Marie Blanc as Heidi Rüegg
 Armin Schweizer as Lehrer Bänninger / Teacher Bänninger
 Mathilde Danegger as Päuli
 Fred Tanner as Robert Scheibli
 Emil Gerber as Ernst Schwarzenbach
 Bernard Ammon as André
 Germaine Tournier as Frau Fleury / Mrs. Fleury
 Schaggi Streuli as Emil Kägi

External links

1944 films
Swiss German-language films
1944 drama films
Swiss black-and-white films
Films whose writer won the Best Original Screenplay Academy Award
Films directed by Leopold Lindtberg
Films directed by Franz Schnyder
Swiss drama films